John Powell (born 18 September 1963) is an English composer best known for his film scores. He has been based in Los Angeles since 1997 and has composed the scores to over 70 feature films. He is best known for composing and/or co-composing scores for animated films, such as Antz (1998), The Road to El Dorado (2000), Chicken Run (2000), Shrek (2001), Robots (2005), the second through fourth Ice Age films (2006–2012), the Happy Feet films (2006–2011), Dr. Seuss' Horton Hears a Who! (2008), the first two Kung Fu Panda films (2008–2011), Bolt (2008), the How to Train Your Dragon trilogy (2010–2019), Mars Needs Moms (2011), the Rio films (2011–2014), Dr. Seuss' The Lorax (2012), and Ferdinand (2017).

His work on Happy Feet, Ferdinand and Solo: A Star Wars Story has earned him three Grammy nominations. He was nominated for an Academy Award for How to Train Your Dragon.

Powell was a member of Hans Zimmer's music studio, Remote Control Productions, and has collaborated frequently with other composers from the studio, including Harry Gregson-Williams on Antz, Chicken Run and Shrek and Zimmer himself on Chill Factor, The Road to El Dorado, and the first two Kung Fu Panda films.

Early life and education
John Powell was born on 18 September 1963 in London. As a child, he played the violin and viola. His skill in the violin allowed him to study at the Trinity College of Music in London. There, he met ‎John Ashton Thomas, who orchestrated many of Powell's scores. Powell played for "Faboulistics", an amateur rock and roll band. 

After finishing college, he composed music for commercials, which led to a job as an assistant to the composer Patrick Doyle on several film productions, including Much Ado About Nothing. In 1995, Powell co-founded the London-based commercial music house Independently Thinking Music, which produced scores for more than 100 British and French commercials and independent films.

Career
Powell's first score was for the Season 4 of the TV series Stay Lucky.  He moved to Los Angeles in 1997 and scored his first major film, Face/Off. It was followed by Antz in 1998, the first film produced by DreamWorks Animation, which he co-scored with fellow British composer Harry Gregson-Williams. Two years later, Powell collaborated with composer Hans Zimmer on the score for The Road to El Dorado. Later that year, he collaborated with Gregson-Williams again on the score to Chicken Run; they collaborated again the following year on Shrek. Gregson-Williams composed all the subsequent Shrek films himself.  In 2001 he also scored Evolution, I Am Sam, Just Visiting and Rat Race.

In 2002 Powell was hired to score The Bourne Identity after Carter Burwell left the project, and has gone on to score all of director Doug Liman's subsequent films. He also returned to score the series' other two films, The Bourne Supremacy and The Bourne Ultimatum, under British director Paul Greengrass.

Powell collaborated with Liman again to score Mr. & Mrs. Smith (2005).  That year he also scored Robots for Blue Sky Studios, and went on to score all of the studio's subsequent films until 2017's Ferdinand.

In 2006, he scored Greengrass' United 93. He also composed music for his second Blue Sky film Ice Age: The Meltdown, following David Newman, who scored the first Ice Age film; as well as X-Men: The Last Stand and Happy Feet, for which he won a Film & TV Music Award for Best Score for an Animated Feature Film. The next year he scored The Bourne Ultimatum. In 2008 he reunited with Hans Zimmer and returned to DreamWorks Animation to score Kung Fu Panda, and also wrote music for Jumper, Dr. Seuss' Horton Hears a Who!, Hancock, and Bolt. In 2009 he scored the third film of Ice Age series; Dawn of the Dinosaurs.

In 2010, Powell composed the score to How to Train Your Dragon, which earned him a nomination for  the Academy Award for Best Original Score. It was his sixth DreamWorks Animation film, although the first where he composed the whole score himself. That year he has also scored Greengrass's Green Zone and Knight and Day.

In 2013, Powell took a sabbatical year from film scoring. In April 2014, after completing his scores to sequels Rio 2 and How to Train Your Dragon 2, he announced he would take another break to compose concert music, including a 45-minute oratorio to commemorate the 100-year anniversary of World War I. The piece, "A Prussian Requiem", with a libretto by Michael Petry, premiered on 6 March 2016 at The Royal Festival Hall, London with José Serebrier conducting the Philharmonia Orchestra.

Powell composed the score for Solo: A Star Wars Story (2018), collaborating with John Williams, who wrote Han Solo's theme. In 2019, Powell scored How to Train Your Dragon: The Hidden World, the final film in the How to Train Your Dragon series.

Filmography

Television

Film

1990s

2000s

2010s

2020s

Studio Albums

Archival soundtrack albums

References

External links
  – official site
 
 
 John Powell biography at SoundtrackNet

1963 births
Animated film score composers
Annie Award winners
Blue Sky Studios people
DreamWorks Animation people
English expatriates in the United States
English film score composers
English male film score composers
Hollywood Records artists
Ivor Novello Award winners
Living people
People from East Sussex
Varèse Sarabande Records artists
Walt Disney Animation Studios people